Alban Ukaj (born in Pristina, 21 July 1980) is a Kosovo-Albanian actor. He attended the Academy of Performing Arts in Sarajevo. He is notable for his role in the film Lorna's Silence and his lead role in the Greek film J.A.C.E. He also appeared in 2003's Fuse.  He is also known for his performances as a stage actor in Kosovo, Albania, Bosnia and Herzegovina, and Serbia.

Selected filmography
 The Marriage (2017)
 Quo Vadis, Aida? (2020)

References

External links

http://www.filmbug.com/db/347007

Living people
1980 births
Actors from Pristina
Kosovan male actors